Need for Speed: Underground is a 2003 racing video game and the seventh installment in the Need for Speed series. It was developed by EA Black Box and published by Electronic Arts. Three different games were produced, one for consoles and Windows, and the other for the Game Boy Advance along with a version developed by Global VR for Arcades that was published by Konami.

Underground rebooted the franchise, ignoring the previous Need for Speed games which featured sports cars and exotics. It was the first game in the series to offer a career mode featuring a storyline, and a garage mode that allowed players to fully customize their cars with a large variety of brand-name performance and visual upgrades. All races take place in the fictional Olympic City. Rather than exotic cars, Underground featured vehicles associated with the import scene. Underground was critically and commercially successful, and was followed by Need for Speed: Underground 2 in 2004.

Plot
The player races in Olympic City in a modified Honda/Acura Integra Type R sporting wide body kits and easily winning over his opponents; only to be woken up by Samantha from his sleep.

Samantha is the player's friend in Olympic City and she tours him across the import culture scene and illegal street racing therein. She helps the player buy his first car, although she mocks the player's choice of the car by calling it "weak". The player also encounters several street racing crews, some of them being Samantha's acquaintances who befriend the player after he proves his racing skills to them. She introduces him to T.J, one of her acquaintances, who promises him with numerous upgrades and parts, provided he wins races. The player races other racers and wins them over, eventually drawing the attention of Eddie, the leader of the Eastsiders gang and Melissa, his beautiful girlfriend. Eddie is the current best underground racer in Olympic City and berates and bullies the player for his racing skills, going as far as mocking him to "take a taxi home so that he can get home faster", but the player proves otherwise. Enraged, Eddie challenges the player to race Samantha, who gets infuriated upon the player's acceptance. She loses after she wrecks her Honda Civic Si during the race, and her car is taken by T.J for himself thereafter and vandalizes it. Deeply saddened by the loss of her car to T.J, Samantha distances herself from the player.

The player eventually keeps winning races offered by Samantha's acquaintances in her absence and later on faces T.J in Samantha's vandalized Civic. T.J loses the race and returns the car to the player, who returns it back to Samantha. They rekindle their friendship and Samantha motivates the player to race Eddie and defeat him once and for all. Eddie challenges the player to a sprint race and loses; while the player's crew are about to celebrate, a mysterious grey Nissan 350Z challenges the player to a final race. The player races the 350Z and wins; while the others celebrate his victory, the driver of the 350Z is revealed to be Melissa.

That event solidifies the player's status as the best underground racer in Olympic City.

Gameplay

Circuit is a standard race that involves racing with up to three opponents' cars around a loop track for two or more laps. It is the main mode of the game.

Knockout Mode is similar to previous Need for Speed titles. It is played on the circuit tracks, and involves "knocking out" the last racer who passes the finish line in each lap until the final leader of the race remains, and wins the race. In Underground, Knockout sessions have a maximum of three laps for four racers.

Sprint mode is a variation on the Circuit mode, where the contestants race in a point-to-point track instead of loop tracks. These races are typically shorter than "circuits" (with a maximum of 8 km in length), so players are required to be more cautious of any mistakes during racing, such as crashing into barriers or vehicles.

Drifting is the most challenging and technical aspect of the game. Drift mode consists of one player in a short loop track, where the objective is to collect as many points as possible by drifting along the track. The player competes with three other contestants, who appear to accumulate scores along with the player during the drift session. The player would be required to beat these scores in order to obtain top positions.

Bonuses are awarded for players who drift in the outer borders of the track, drift vertically, or perform chained-drifting (continuous drifting by constantly steering the vehicle during drifts to maintain speed); if the player succeeds in ending a drift without collisions onto the sides of the track, the collected points are added into the score, otherwise, the collected points are cancelled.

Drift mode is the only type of racing where time taken to complete the track does not matter, since players are given the freedom to complete the allocated number of laps at their own pace, hence here is no nitrous oxide in this mode.

Drag racing is the second most technical form of race in the game. It involves racing against one or three cars on typically straight tracks and attempting to obtain top positions to win. In order to master Drag mode, players must employ good timing and reflexes for gear shifting, redlining, overtaking, and the use of nitrous oxide boosts. Since players must use manual transmission, drag races place particular emphasis in monitoring the tachometer and the engine temperature during races, which is enlarged and displayed on the left side of the screen. Steering in this mode is simplified to simply allow for lane changes, while the computer handles the steering along the lanes, and the player focuses more on maintaining an optimum speed for the car.

Two conditions will result in players being forfeited during a drag race: head-on collisions with an opponent, barriers, traffic cars or dividers (being 'totaled'); or blown engines as a result from prolonged redlining and the subsequent overheating of the engine.

Car customization
In the car customization menu, cars can be altered with performance upgrades and visual upgrades, such as paint colours, vinyls, neon, custom front and rear bumpers, custom side skirts, spoilers, custom hoods, exhaust tips, roof scoops, custom tires and stickers, and wide body kits.

Players can apply performance upgrades to their vehicles. The player can upgrade their car's engine, drivetrain, suspension, tires, engine control unit (ECU) as well as add nitrous oxide, turbochargers and reduce the car's weight (in the form of "weight reduction packages"). Performance upgrades are earned by completing certain races in the story mode.

Vehicles
Underground features a total of 20 fully licensed cars. In contrast to previous installments that featured predominantly exotic cars, the cars in Underground are exclusively tuner-type cars. Underground is also notable for being the first game in the Need for Speed series to offer a Korean-made car as a playable car. The car in question is the Hyundai Tiburon.

Style Points
First introduced in Underground was the Style Points system, strongly influenced from "The Kudos" system in Metropolis Street Racer and Project Gotham Racing. Style Points are rewarded to the player for performing stunts and being competitive in race events. Style Points can be multiplied by the Style Modifier, which can be increased by visually modifying the player's car. The more "tricked out" the design of the player's car, the higher their score gets multiplied. Style Points are earned by drafting, powersliding, taking shortcuts, closely avoiding traffic, and avoiding walls. Style Points gradually unlock visual upgrades for the player's car, as well as custom cars they can drive.

Soundtrack
The game's soundtrack contains 26 licensed songs, ranging from rap, hip hop, rock, EDM, and drum and bass, sung by artists like Nate Dogg, T.I., as well as Lil Jon & The Eastside Boyz (who are best known for singing the game's theme song, Get Low), Petey Pablo, Static-X, Rob Zombie, Lostprophets, The Crystal Method, Junkie XL, Andy Hunter, Asian Dub Foundation and BT (who is best known for producing the game's opening song, "Kimosabe"). The main menu mostly plays hip hop music, while the race sequences mostly play the electronica, metal, and techno music, though it is also optional for the player to integrate the main menu music into the race sequences or the race music into the main menu.

Development
Need for Speed: Underground was first announced in April 2003. Underground features 20 fully customizable licensed Vehicles from thirteen manufacturers, and hundreds of aftermarket parts from no fewer than 52 aftermarket parts manufacturers, including Bilstein, Holley Performance Products, GReddy, Sparco, HKS Power, PIAA Corporation and Enkei. The game's visual effects was designed under the supervision of Habib Zargarpour, who previously worked on the pod-racing sequence in Star Wars: Episode I – The Phantom Menace. Need for Speed: Underground went gold (became ready for release) and was released worldwide in November for PC, PlayStation 2, Xbox and Nintendo GameCube (with the exception of Japan for PS2 and Gamecube on December 25).

Reception

Need for Speed: Underground received positive reviews according to review aggregators GameRankings and Metacritic. Both gave it a score of 84.29% and 85 out of 100 for the PlayStation 2 version, 83.73% and 83 out of 100 for the GameCube version, 82.29% and 82 out of 100 for the PC version, 81.76% and 83 out of 100 for the Xbox version and 77.33% and 77 out of 100 for the Game Boy Advance version. The only complaints critics had were the repetitive tracks, unbalanced rubberband AI, especially in the game's Easy mode, and the lack of free roam and damage in the game, with the latter only confining to detachment of licence plates and side mirrors from cars during collisions, especially during Drag races.

In the UK, Official UK PlayStation 2 Magazine gave the PS2 version a score of nine out of ten and made much of the illegal nature of the gameplay. They praised the speed, but called the title as another driving game with Hollywood sparkle. In Japan, Famitsu gave the GameCube and PS2 versions a score of two eights and two nines, bringing it to a score of 34 out of 40.

Sales
According to Electronic Arts, Need for Speed: Underground was a commercial hit, with sales above 7 million units worldwide by mid-2004. Underground ultimately sold 15 million copies worldwide.

By July 2006, the PlayStation 2 version of Underground had sold 2.6 million copies and earned $115 million in the United States alone. Next Generation ranked it as the sixth highest-selling game launched for the PlayStation 2, Xbox or GameCube between January 2000 and July 2006 in that country. It was the highest-selling Need for Speed game released between those dates in the United States. The PlayStation 2 version also received a "Double Platinum" sales award from the Entertainment and Leisure Software Publishers Association (ELSPA), indicating sales of at least 600,000 copies in the United Kingdom, where it had sold 700,000 copies by January 2004.

Awards
The editors of Computer Gaming World presented Underground with their 2003 "Racing Game of the Year" award.

Need for Speed: Underground also won The Electric Playgrounds 2003 "Best Driving Game for PC" award, the 7th Annual Interactive Achievements Awards for "Console Racing Game of the Year", and  The CESA Game Awards for "Global Awards (overseas works)" from CESA and Ministry of Economy, Trade and Industry.

References

External links 
 
 

2003 video games
Game Boy Advance games
Game Boy Advance-only games
GameCube games
Interactive Achievement Award winners
 07
PlayStation 2 games
Street racing video games
Video games scored by Allister Brimble
Video games developed in Canada
Video games developed in the United Kingdom
Video game reboots
Video games scored by BT (musician)
Video games set in the United States
Video games with cross-platform play
Windows games
Xbox games
D.I.C.E. Award for Racing Game of the Year winners